No, No, No is the debut album by Jamaican reggae singer Dawn Penn, released in 1994. The album was released nearly 30 years after Penn embarked on a recording career, following up the worldwide success of her single "You Don't Love Me (No, No, No)" in 1994. The album, however, was met with a modest chart success.

Track listing

Charts

References

External links
 No, No, No at Discogs
 No, No, No at Rate Your Music

1994 debut albums
Dawn Penn albums
Albums produced by Steely & Clevie
Big Beat Records (American record label) albums